James Champion VC MSM (1834 – 4 May 1904) was an English recipient of the Victoria Cross, the highest and most prestigious award for gallantry in the face of the enemy that can be awarded to British and Commonwealth forces.

Details
Champion was approximately 24 years old, and a Troop Sergeant-Major in the 8th King's Royal Irish Hussars, British Army during the Indian Mutiny when the following deed took place on 8 September 1858 at Beejapore, India, for which he was awarded the VC:

He later joined the Royal Gloucestershire Hussars.

The medal
The medal is displayed at Eastbourne Redoubt Fortress Museum, Royal Parade, Eastbourne, East Sussex

References

Location of grave and VC medal (W. London)

External links
http://www.victoriacross.org.uk/puchampi.htm
Redoubt Fortress Museum
Eastbourne Redoubt
 http://www.marshallfamilytree.uk - information on James Champion as he is my great great grandfather!

1834 births
1904 deaths
British recipients of the Victoria Cross
Indian Rebellion of 1857 recipients of the Victoria Cross
8th King's Royal Irish Hussars soldiers
British Army personnel of the Crimean War
People from Hammersmith
British Yeomanry soldiers
British Army recipients of the Victoria Cross
Royal Gloucestershire Hussars soldiers
Recipients of the Meritorious Service Medal (United Kingdom)